Denis Murray (3 March 1878 – 19 September 1944) was an Irish athlete.  He competed at the 1908 Summer Olympics in London. In the 100 metres, Murray placed third in his first round heat to be eliminated from competition.  In the Men's Long jump, Murray finished 9th.

References

Sources
 
 
 

1878 births
1944 deaths
Athletes (track and field) at the 1908 Summer Olympics
Olympic athletes of Great Britain
Irish male sprinters